Lepidosperma elatius is a species of plant from sedge family that can be found in Australia (in New South Wales, Victoria, Queensland and Tasmania). The plant flowers from November to April.

References

elatius
Flora of New South Wales
Flora of Queensland
Flora of Tasmania
Flora of Victoria (Australia)
Plants described in 1805